Joan Berger [Knebl] (October 9, 1933 – September 11, 2021) was a infielder and outfielder who played from  through  in the All-American Girls Professional Baseball League. She was born in Passaic, New Jersey.

An All-Star at second base, Joan Berger played in the last four seasons of the All-American Girls Professional Baseball League. Her accomplishments also included winning the Rookie of the Year Award and playing in the All-American touring team piloted by Bill Allington.

Early life
Reflecting on her early influences, Berger explained that her father Slim Berger was a semiprofessional baseball player who helped her learn to play the game. My father was a great sportsman, he used to take me to all his games and I went in the field during his practices. Her father later formed the Garfield Flashettes, which became the first girls' softball team based in Garfield, New Jersey. Berger  joined her father's team when she was in eighth grade, and tried out for the AAGPBL as a sophomore at Garfield High School, but she was too young to join the league. She attended to a new tryout the next year, but her father advised her to wait until the next year. Finally, Berger joined the league in 1951 after graduating from high school. She was allocated to the Rockford Peaches, a team managed by the aforementioned Bill Allington.

AAGPBL
Berger entered the league as a right fielder, hitting a .251 average in only 40 games. At this point, she maintained her rookie status for the following season. In 1952 she switched to second base, won Rookie of the Year honors, and was the only rookie to make the All-Star Team. The next season she played shortstop and second, splitting her playing time between third base and second in 1954, when she hit a career-high .280 during what turned out to be the league's final season. Rockford made the playoffs from 1951 to 1953 but failed to win the championship.

Allington All-Stars
Following her AAGPBL career, Berger  joined several other players on Bill Allington's All-American team, a barnstorming remnant of the league. The Allington All-Stars played 100 games between 1954 and 1958, each booked in a different town, against male teams, while traveling over 10,000 miles in the manager's station wagon and a Ford Country Sedan. Besides Berger, the Allington All-Stars included players as Gloria Cordes, Jeanie Descombes, Gertrude Dunn, Betty Foss, Mary Froning, Jean Geissinger, Katie Horstman, Maxine Kline, Dolores Lee, Magdalen Redman, Ruth Richard, Dorothy Schroeder, Jean Smith, Dolly Vanderlip and Joanne Weaver, among others.

Personal life
Berger married Andrew Knebl in 1959 and settled down to raise a family. She had three boys, Andrew Jr., Kevin and Robert, and has five granddaughters. She worked for Ferrero USA for eight years and retired in 1994.

She lived in Lodi, New Jersey.

Berger died on September 11, 2021, at the age of 87.

Statistics
Batting

Fielding

Sources

1933 births
2021 deaths
All-American Girls Professional Baseball League players
Baseball players from New Jersey
Garfield High School (New Jersey) alumni
People from Garfield, New Jersey
People from Lodi, New Jersey
Sportspeople from Bergen County, New Jersey
Sportspeople from Passaic, New Jersey
Rockford Peaches players
21st-century American women